Loretta Jean Fuddy (April 12, 1948 – December 11, 2013) was an American health official and social worker from the U.S. state of Hawaii. Fuddy served simultaneously as the Director of the Hawaii Department of Health and the Mayor of Kalawao County from 2011 until her death. Under Hawaii state law, the Hawaii Department of Health administers Kalawao County, and the Director of the Hawaii Department of Health, who is appointed by the governor, simultaneously serves as the Mayor of Kalawao County while in office.

Life and career
Fuddy, who was born on April 12, 1948, was nicknamed "Deliana." She was raised in Kaimuki, on the island of Oahu, and graduated from Sacred Hearts Academy. In a 2013 interview, she described her upbringing as the motivation behind her career in public service, "I'm a child of the ’60s, the Kennedy era of 'ask what you can do for your country' public service and Catholic values." She received degrees in sociology, social work and public health from the University of Hawaii. Fuddy also completed doctoral studies at the Johns Hopkins School of Medicine in Baltimore, Maryland.

Fuddy was a practitioner of Subud spiritualist movement, and she was the chairwoman of Subud USA's National Committee from 2006 to 2008.

Fuddy worked in health and human services for forty years. More recently, she served as the Deputy Director of the Hawaii Department of Health from 2001 until 2002. She then became the Chief of Family Health Services for the state health department prior to her appointment as Director in 2011.

Fuddy became the acting Director of the Hawaii Department of Health on January 26, 2011. Governor Neil Abercrombie appointed her Director of the department on March 2, 2011. The Department of Health administers the small county of Kalawao, so Fuddy also became the Mayor of Kalawao County under Hawaii state law. Fuddy was the first social worker to serve as Hawaii's health director.

Fuddy also is remembered as the Director of the Hawaii Department of Health who was responsible for issuing a copy of President Barack Obama's birth certificate in 2011. Some individuals, known as "birthers," had questioned the authenticity of Obama's birth certificate and claimed that he was not born in the United States. In response to these claims, the White House released a copy of Obama's long-form birth certificate.

Death 

On December 11, 2013, Fuddy traveled to Kalawao County for an annual meeting with the county's Hansen's disease patients in Kalaupapa as part of her duties as both Mayor and state health director. Fuddy and other officials concluded the meeting and boarded a plane to return to Honolulu. Her plane, a Makani Kai Cessna Caravan 208B, crashed into the Pacific Ocean off the north coast of Molokai shortly after takeoff from Kalaupapa Airport at approximately 3:30 p.m. Fuddy, who was 65 years old, eventually died from heart failure while she and the others awaited rescue. The eight other people on the plane, who included Deputy Health Director Keith Yamamoto, Kalaupapa National Park administrator Rosa Key, and the Makani Kai pilot, survived the crash and were rescued. Fuddy was the only fatality in the crash.

Her funeral was held at the Co-Cathedral of Saint Theresa of the Child Jesus in Honolulu on December 21, 2013. Speakers included Governor Neil Abercrombie. Attendees included state Senators Michelle Kidani and Suzanne Chun Oakland.

References

1948 births
2013 deaths
American social workers
Mayors of Kalawao County
Women mayors of places in Hawaii
Johns Hopkins School of Medicine alumni
University of Hawaiʻi at Mānoa alumni
People from Honolulu
State cabinet secretaries of Hawaii
21st-century American women